Robert Eli Bremer (born May 31, 1978) is an American modern pentathlete and politician who competed for the United States at the 2008 Summer Olympics in Beijing, China. He finished 22nd overall in the modern pentathlon event. After retiring as an athlete, he has since begun a career in politics.

Early life and education
Bremer was born in Hancock, New Hampshire, but grew up in Colorado Springs, Colorado. He earned a Bachelor of Science degree from the United States Air Force Academy

Career
Bremer serves as a major in the Air Force Reserve Command. He was a Regional Finalist in the 2008 White House Fellows Program.  He also worked as an NBC Olympic Color Commentator in 2004 and 2012. At the 2008 Olympics, Eli wrote a widely read feature blog for USA Today.

In 2011, Bremer co-founded Socon Media with business partner Mike Lindley. Bremer served as the chair of the El Paso County Republican Party from 2011 to 2013.

2022 U.S. Senate election in Colorado 

On August 10, 2021, Bremer announced that he would be running for the United States Senate in the 2022 election as a Republican. He was endorsed by former senator, Olympian and Air Force veteran Ben Nighthorse Campbell. While Bremer has acknowledged that Joe Biden is president, Bremer has questioned the validity of the 2020 presidential election results, saying "Looking at the election results there were a lot of anomalies, and that’s just a mathematical fact." Bremer was eliminated at the Colorado Republican Party convention after failing to receive the required minimum of 30% of the delegate vote.

Personal life 
Bremer is the nephew of diplomat Paul Bremer. He is married to Camille "Cami" Grebel-Bremer.

References

External links

 
 

1978 births
American male modern pentathletes
Colorado Republicans
Living people
Medalists at the 2007 Pan American Games
Modern pentathletes at the 2007 Pan American Games
Modern pentathletes at the 2008 Summer Olympics
Olympic modern pentathletes of the United States
Pan American Games gold medalists for the United States
Pan American Games medalists in modern pentathlon
People from Hancock, New Hampshire
Sportspeople from Hillsborough County, New Hampshire
United States Air Force Academy alumni
United States Air Force World Class Athlete Program
21st-century American people